Mifiposeti Paea (born 6 July 1988) is a Tongan-born Japanese rugby union footballer who plays as a centre.

Paea currently plays for the Osaka-based NTT DoCoMo Red Hurricanes having joined them in 2011.   He was named in the first ever  squad which will compete in Super Rugby from the 2016 season. He moved to Fukaya in 2004 and enjoyed the game through Shochi Fukaya High School and Saitama Institute of Technology. After that he acquired Japanese citizenship.

References

1987 births
Living people
Tongan rugby union players
Tongan expatriate rugby union players
Tongan expatriate sportspeople in Japan
Expatriate rugby union players in Japan
Rugby union centres
NTT DoCoMo Red Hurricanes Osaka players
Sunwolves players
Japan international rugby union players